Piedras Blancas is a barrio (neighbourhood or district) of Montevideo, Uruguay.

Places of worship 
 Parish Church of Our Lady of the Rosary of Pompei (Roman Catholic)

See also 
Barrios of Montevideo

Barrios of Montevideo